Rafeeq Saudagar (Urdu: ڈاکٹر رفیق سوداگر , born 28 March 1971) is an Indian Urdu poet and doctor. He is President of the Anjuman Muhibban-e-Urdu (Yadgir Unit). He was awarded " Achievers Award " by Karnataka Urdu Academy and Karnataka Centre Muslim Association in Raichur on 23 June 2019. He is from Yadgir district, Karnataka.

Early life
Saudagar was born to Abdul Razak Saudagar and Hafeeza Begum on 28 March 1971 in Kadechur, Yadgir district, Karnataka.

Saugagar completed Graduation in BUMS from Tip sultan Unani Medical College Gulbarga and D.Pharma from P.B College of Pharmacy Yadgir. He is a doctor and Urdu poet by profession.

He began writing poetry at the age of 18 but published his first book in 2004 and he is also a supporter of the Urdu language and the Urdu-speaking people of India.

Personal life
Saudagar married Kahkashan Saudagar in 2004. The couple has three sons and lives in Millat Nagar, Yadgir City of Karnataka State.

Positions held
 President - All India Urdu Development Organization - 2012–Present.
 President - Anjuman Muhibban-e-Urdu (Yadgir Unit) - 2012–Present.

Awards
 Achievers award - Karnataka Urdu Academy and Karnataka Centre Muslim Association.

Bibliography
 Safar Kahkashan Ka.
 Yaad e Maazi.

References

External links 

 Dr Rafeeq Saudagar - WikiMedia.
Rafeeq Saudagar official Facebook page

1971 births
People from Karnataka
People from Kalaburagi district
People from Yadgir district
Urdu in India
Urdu-language poets from India
Writers from Bangalore
Living people
Indian male poets
Indian Muslims
20th-century Indian poets
Poets from Karnataka
20th-century Indian male writers